"A Horse with No Name" is a song by the folk rock band America, written by Dewey Bunnell. It was the band's first and most successful single, released in late 1971 in Europe and early 1972 in the United States, that topped the charts in Canada, Finland, and the United States. It was certified gold by the Recording Industry Association of America.

Development
America's self-titled debut album was released initially in Europe, without "A Horse with No Name", and achieved only moderate success. Originally called "Desert Song", "Horse" was written while the band was staying at the home of studio musician Arthur Brown, near Puddletown, Dorset, England. The first two demos were recorded there by Jeff Dexter and Dennis Elliott, which were intended to capture the sensation of the hot, dry desert that had been depicted in a Salvador Dalí painting, and in a picture by M. C. Escher which featured a horse. Writer Dewey Bunnell also says he remembered his childhood travels through the Arizona and New Mexico desert when his family lived at Vandenberg Air Force Base.   Bunnell has explained that "A Horse with No Name" was "a metaphor for a vehicle to get away from life's confusion into a quiet, peaceful place".

Trying to find a song that would be popular in both the United States and Europe, Warner Brothers was reluctant to release Gerry Beckley's "I Need You" ballad as the first single from America. The label asked the band if it had any other material, then arranged for America to record four more songs at Morgan Studios, in Willesden, London. "A Horse with No Name" was released as the featured song on a three-track single in the UK, Ireland, France, Italy and the Netherlands in late 1971. On the release, "A Horse with No Name" shared the A-side with "Everyone I Meet Is from California"; "Sandman" featured on the B-side. However, its early-1972 two-track US release did not include "Sandman", with "Everyone I Meet Is from California" appearing on the B-side.

Composition
"A Horse with No Name" was recorded in E minor with acoustic guitars, bass guitar, drum kit, and bongo drums. The only other chord is a D, fretted on the low E and G strings, second fret. A 12-string guitar plays an added F♯ (second fret, high E string) on the back beat of the Em. A noted feature of the song is the driving bass line with a hammer-hook in each chorus. A "waterfall"-type solo completes the arrangement. Produced by Ian Samwell on the day of final recording at Morgan Studios, when at first the group thought it was too corny and took some convincing to actually play it. Gerry Beckley has explained in Acoustic Guitar magazine (March 2007) that the correct tuning for the guitar is D E D G B D, low to high. The chord pattern that repeats throughout the entire song is: 202002 (Em), then 020202 and 000202. The tuning is unique to this song; they did not use it on any other America song.

Reception
Despite the song being banned by some U.S. radio stations, in Kansas City and elsewhere, because of supposed drug references to heroin use ("horse" is a common slang term for heroin), the song ascended to number one on the U.S. Billboard Hot 100, and the album quickly reached platinum status. The song charted earlier in Ireland (reaching number 4), the Netherlands (reaching number 11) and the UK (reaching number 3, the band's only Top 40 hit in the country) than it did in the United States.

The song's resemblance to some of Neil Young's work aroused some controversy. For example, in their review of "A Horse with No Name" Cash Box described America as "CSN&Y soundalikes." "I know that virtually everyone, on first hearing, assumed it was Neil", Bunnell said. "I never fully shied away from the fact that I was inspired by him. I think it's in the structure of the song as much as in the tone of his voice. It did hurt a little, because we got some pretty bad backlash. I've always attributed it more to people protecting their own heroes more than attacking me." By coincidence, it was "A Horse with No Name" that replaced Young's "Heart of Gold" at the number 1 spot on the U.S. pop chart.

The single achieved sales of over 50,000 copies in Australia, being eligible for the award of a gold disc.

The song has received criticism for its lyrics, including "The heat was hot"; "There were plants, and birds, and rocks, and things"; and "'Cause there ain't no one for to give you no pain." According to an anecdote from Robert Christgau, Randy Newman dismissed "A Horse With No Name" as a "song about a kid who  he’s taken acid".

Penn Jillette asked the band about their lyrics, "there were plants, and birds, and rocks, and things" after a show in Atlantic City, where America opened for Penn & Teller. According to Jillette, their explanation for the lyrics was that they were intoxicated with cannabis while writing it. In a 2012 interview, Beckley disputed Jillette's story, saying, "I don't think Dew was stoned."

Personnel 
(Per back cover of 1972 vinyl issue of America.)

America
 Dewey Bunnell – lead vocals, acoustic guitar
 Gerry Beckley – 12-string acoustic guitars, backing vocals
 Dan Peek – bass, backing vocals

Session musicians
 Ray Cooper – percussion
 Kim Haworth – drums

Cover version
In the season 4 episode of BoJack Horseman "The Old Sugarman Place", the title character drives through the desert to Patrick Carney and Michelle Branch's interpretation of the song. This version also appears on the soundtrack album of the series.

In popular culture
 
For the Breaking Bad episode, Caballo sin Nombre, the episode begins with Walter White driving through the New Mexico desert while listening to the song.

The song appears on both the fictional in-game radio station "K-DST" and on the official CD soundtrack boxset for Rockstar Games' 2004 open-world video game Grand Theft Auto: San Andreas.

Musical references
Michael Jackson's song "A Place with No Name" was released posthumously by TMZ as a 25-second snippet on July 16, 2009. The snippet closely resembles "A Horse with No Name". Jim Morey, both Jackson's and America's former band manager, has stated that "America was honored that Michael chose to do their song and they hope it becomes available for all Michael's fans to hear." The song was remastered and released in its entirety along with the original Michael Jackson recording on Jackson's 2014 album, Xscape.

The song was sampled by Milo in his song "Geometry and Theology" from his album Cavalcade, in which every song samples a song by America.

The song is name-checked in the 1991 Tin Machine song 'Stateside' on the Tin Machine II album.

Charts

Year-end charts

All-time charts

Certifications

See also
 List of fictional horses

References

External links
Official America Homepage

1971 songs
1971 debut singles
1972 singles
Songs written by Dewey Bunnell
America (band) songs
Billboard Hot 100 number-one singles
Cashbox number-one singles
Warner Records singles
RPM Top Singles number-one singles
Song recordings produced by Ian Samwell